The third and final season of King of the Nerds aired on TBS from January 23, 2015, to March 13, 2015. Inspired by the Revenge of the Nerds films, the season was hosted by actors and executive producers Robert Carradine and Curtis Armstrong, known for their roles as Lewis Skolnick and Dudley "Booger" Dawson, respectively, in Revenge of the Nerds.

Contestants

Contestant progress

:  Teams were dissolved and Nerd Wars became individual challenges.
:  The loser(s) of the Nerd War were automatically eliminated.
Key
 (WINNER) The contestant won the competition and was crowned "King of the Nerds".
 (RUNNER-UP) The contestant was the runner-up in the competition.
 (WIN) The contestant won the Nerd War and received immunity from elimination.
 (IN) The contestant lost the Nerd War, but was not selected to compete in the Nerd-Off.
 (RISK) The contestant won the Nerd-Off and escaped elimination.
 (OUT) The contestant lost the Nerd-Off and was eliminated from the competition.
Teams
 The contestant was a member of Team S.M.A.S.H. (Supersonic Masters And Slayers of Hordes).
 The contestant was a member of Team House Hooloovoo.

Episodes

References

External links
 
 

2015 American television seasons
Nerd culture